"I Walk the Line Revisited" is a song recorded by Rodney Crowell with Johnny Cash, who sings the lyrics of his song "I Walk the Line" to a new melody.

Released as a single in 1998, it peaked at number 61 on U.S. Billboard country chart for the week of November 28.

In 2001, the song appeared on Rodney Crowell's album The Houston Kid and was re-issued as a promo single from that album.

Track listing

Charts

References

External links 
 "I Walk the Line Revisited" on the Johnny Cash official website
 

1998 songs
Rodney Crowell songs
Johnny Cash songs
1998 singles
Songs written by Rodney Crowell
Songs written by Johnny Cash
Reprise Records singles
American country music songs